Lucy Westenra is a fictional character in the 1897 novel Dracula by Bram Stoker. The 19-year-old daughter of a wealthy family, she is Mina Murray's best friend and Count Dracula's first English victim. She subsequently transforms into a vampire and is eventually destroyed.

Character history
Lucy Westenra is a woman, "blonde, demure, and waiting for the right man to come along to marry her". She is, however, not a passive woman: she has three suitors, and writes to her friend Mina that she would like to marry all of them, so none of them will feel sad. All three propose to her on the same day—Arthur Holmwood, the wealthy son of Lord Godalming; Quincey Morris, an American adventurer; and Dr. John Seward, a psychiatrist—and she chooses Holmwood. Lucy falls sick, and much to the men's dismay, no explanation can be found as to why her strength is leaving her. It is then that Dr. Seward summons Dr. Abraham Van Helsing from the Netherlands, who is able to deduce that a vampire has been feeding on her. Helsing attempts to thwart Dracula by securing the house with garlic. However, under the vampire's influence, she becomes prone to sleepwalking and is drawn outside, where the count fatally drains her of blood. In her final moments, her vampiric side emerges and nearly tries to bite Arthur, but Lucy regains her human senses and before dying asks Abraham Van Helsing to protect Holmwood.

A week after her burial Lucy rises from the grave as a vampire, attacking children, which Van Helsing identifies by the telltale bite marks on their necks and the timing of her death and the start of the attacks. While visiting her tomb after dark, the men encounter her undead corpse feeding on a child. Far from the pure, kind-hearted young woman she was in life, she appears as a predatory temptress. Seward describes the vampire as: “Lucy Westenra, but yet how changed. The sweetness was turned to adamantine, heartless cruelty, and the purity to voluptuous wantonness.” 

She attempts to seduce her former fiance, but Van Helsing repels her with a crucifix. The vampire flees into her tomb as the sun rises, allowing Van Helsing and her suitors to open her coffin and drive a wooden stake through her heart, destroying the vampire and allowing Lucy to rest in peace. To ensure the creature's destruction, they also cut off her head, fill her mouth with garlic, and solder the coffin lid shut. Lucy's death and subsequent transformation into a vampire motivate her suitors and Mina to join forces with Van Helsing and Jonathan Harker in hunting Dracula in retaliation.

Critical readings, historical background
According to Sally Ledger, Lucy "is at first sight an archetype of Victorian femininity" but later shares characteristics with the then-feminist ideal of the New Woman.

Leslie Ann Minot pointed out, in a 2017 essay on Lucy Westenra and other 19th century female characters, that if Dracula is an overt portrayal of a sexualized monster then Westenra is problematic since her attacks on children would then equate to "the sweet Lucy sexually molesting toddlers"; Minot sees this as one reason why the character has received less attention than others. She historicizes the character (and the novel) by placing it against a backdrop of a number of well-publicized cases of molestation and abuse of children by mother figures, particularly in the context of baby farming, citing the case of Margaret Waters). Victorian society had begun to take an interest in the welfare of children, resulting in the Factory Act of 1891 and the foundation of the SPCC, which would become the National Society for the Prevention of Cruelty to Children.

Stoker was well aware of these developments and was close friends with W. T. Stead, the newspaper editor who supported the SPCC, published lurid accounts of child abuse and was himself jailed for the abduction of a 13-year old girl, which he organized as a demonstration. Stoker used newspaper clippings in the novel that are pastiches of the sensationalist writings of Stead and others about child prostitution, in particular Stead's "The Maiden Tribute of Modern Babylon", and he describes the lower-class victims in much the same way. Their childish talk leads to "bloofer lady" as a child's way of saying "beautiful lady". This "bloofer lady" talks to children and lures them with the promise of riches and games, and after returning, bearing bite marks, they become emaciated and weak and wish to return to the "bloofer lady". All this is described in language similar to that of newspaper reports on women seducing children into prostitution. Minot also called Lucy "a demonic mother-parody, taking nourishment from children instead of giving it".

Appearances

On screen
Ruth Landshoff appears as Ruth (a character similar to Lucy), the sister of shipbuilder Harding, in the 1922 German silent film Nosferatu.
Frances Dade was the first young woman to play the speaking role in the cinema in the first film of Universal Studios' Dracula series, though her character was credited as Lucy Weston. In the Spanish-language version of the same year, Carmen Guerrero portrays Lucia Weston. In both films, her death after becoming a vampire occurs off-screen, and is only implied in the English version.
In the 1953 Turkish film Drakula İstanbul'da she is called Sadan, and is played by Ayfer Feray.
In 1958, Hammer Films' Dracula Lucy is Arthur Holmwood's sister, and her fiancé is Jonathan Harker. She becomes a victim, and later "bride" of Dracula as revenge against Jonathan Harker for destroying his former bride. Lucy meets the same fate as her literary character, although she tries to attack Arthur before being destroyed. She is played by Carol Marsh.
Susan George played another Lucy Weston in a TV version of Dracula in 1968. In this version she is the one who bites Mina and turns her into vampire.
In 1970, Soledad Miranda portrayed Lucy Westenra in Count Dracula by Jesus Franco.
In the 1971 Czechoslovakian TV movie Hrabe Drakula Lucy is portrayed by Hana Maciuchová. Her last name is never mentioned in this version. 
Dan Curtis's 1973 TV version of Dracula starred Fiona Lewis as Lucy Westenra. In this version, Lucy's character was Dracula's reincarnated love.
Charlotte Blunt portrayed Lucy in the 1973 Dracula episode of the Canadian Purple Playhouse TV series. This version portrayed Mina and Lucy as sisters, and Lucy's full name was Lucy Murray.
The BBC's version of Dracula saw Susan Penhaligon as Lucy Westenra in 1977. This version was first aired in the US as part of the Great Performances series. This version portrayed Mina and Lucy as sisters.
The characters of Lucy and Mina were switched in 1979 film Nosferatu: Phantom der Nacht. In this version what was the Stoker's Lucy character is now named Mina, she is the one to be killed by vampire. She is played by Martje Grohmann. What was Stoker's Mina character is now named Lucy Harker, she is wife of Jonathan Harker and Dracula’s second and main victim. She is played by Isabelle Adjani. 
The characters of Lucy and Mina were also switched in 1979 film Dracula starring Frank Langella. What was the Stoker's Lucy character is now named Mina Van Helsing, the daughter of Dr. Abraham Van Helsing, who arrives after her death, finds her to be a vampire and kills her. She is played by Jan Francis. What was the Stoker's Mina character is now named Lucy Seward, the daughter of Dr. Seward and fiancee of Jonathan Harker. This character survives Dracula's power, and only momentarily becomes his bride. She is played by Kate Nelligan.
In Bram Stoker's Dracula (1992), directed by Francis Ford Coppola, Lucy is played by Sadie Frost. Lucy is eroticized much further than her literary incarnation, becoming more than seductive and coquettish, even tempting. As a spoiled child of aristocracy, she talks with artlessness and frankness, bordering on the indecent, though at the same time remaining a kind-hearted and sweet young girl. Unlike her friend Mina, who stays resolute, Lucy's flirty nature is to be her downfall. She is drawn into Dracula’s claws because of her sleepwalking.
Lucy Westenra was played by Lysette Anthony in Mel Brooks' parody Dracula: Dead and Loving It (1995).
In Dracula, a 2002 Italian miniseries (also known as Dracula's Curse), Lucy is portrayed by Muriel Baumeister.
In Dracula: Pages from a Virgin's Diary, a 2002 ballet/silent film version directed by Guy Maddin, dancer Tara Birtwhistle portrayed Lucy Westenra.
In BBC One's 2006 adaptation of Dracula, Lucy was played by Sophia Myles. Her character remained largely unchanged, although she serves as an unintentional catalyst for events as her husband, Arthur Holmwood, arranges for Dracula to come to Britain in the hope that Dracula will be able to cure him of the syphilis that prevents him from consummating his marriage to Lucy.
In the 2008 Indian Telugu-language television series for Gemini TV, Dracula, her character is portrayed by Lakshmi.
Lucy was played by Asia Argento in the 2012 film Dracula 3D. In this version she is named Lucy Kisslinger. She is also daughter of the local mayor at the Transylvanian village.
In the 2013 Indian Malayalam-language film, Dracula 2012, her character is portrayed by Priya Nambiar.
In NBC's 2013 production of Dracula, Lucy Westenra is played by Katie McGrath. In this version, Lucy is bisexual and harbors secret romantic feelings for Mina.
 In the BBC's 2020 Dracula miniseries, Lucy Westenra, played by Lydia West, is re-imagined as a modern, promiscuous party girl, and a willing victim/associate of Dracula. However, after she is cremated before she can awaken as a vampire, she spends a few hours apparently deluding herself into believing that she is still beautiful before she is forced to face her true appearance, after which she commits suicide.
  Bram Stoker's Van Helsing (2021) film focuses on Dracula's attack on Lucy, her transformation into a vampire and her eventual staking. She's played by Charlie Bond.

Characters based on Lucy
In Dracula 2000, singer Vitamin C played Lucy Westerman, one of Dracula's vampire victims then brides in 2000 New Orleans. The character shows no similarity to the original character from the book though and is not a modern adaptation of the character since the plot of the movie serves as sequel to original events, which happened in 1897 in London.
In Michael Oblowitz's 2001 movie The Breed, Lucy Westenra, played by Bai Ling, is a wealthy beautiful vampire artist and has a human detective boyfriend.
  Ana Ilic portrayed Lucy in Dracula: The Original Living Vampire (2022). Here, Lucy is an eroticized character who only has a few scenes in the film, such as her being bitten and turned by Dracula. She is just some random victim of Dracula and has no personal connections with any of the main characters of the story.

On stage
The first stage production was an adaptation by Stoker himself, performed only once, at the Lyceum Theatre on 18 May 1897 under the title Dracula, or The Undead; Miss Foster played the part of Lucy Westenra.
In 1924 play Dracula by Hamilton Deane the character is named Lucy Westera and she is already dead in the beginning of the play. In 1927 John.L.Balderston revised the play for American audiences and the name of female characters were swapped. What was Lucy character is now named Mina Weston and she is also already dead in the beginning of the play. The Mina character is now named Lucy Seward, Dr. Seward's daughter, who falls under Dracula's power but is saved from death at the end of the play. Dorothy Peterson originated the role of Lucy Seward in the Broadway production of the play.
In the Argentinian Drácula, el musical, by Pepe Cibrián and Angel Mahler, Lucy was played by Paola Krum (1991 and 1992), Alejandra Radano (1994), Karina K (1997), Romina Groppo (2000), Georgina Frere (2003), Florencia Benítez (2007), Georgina Reynaldi (2007), Luna Perez Lening (2011).
In Drácula Siglo XXI (2011) by Argentinian composer Pablo Flores Torres, she is played by Gabriela Moya Grgic
In Dracula, The Musical, which opened on Broadway in 2004, Lucy Westenra was played by Kelli O'Hara.
In 2006, Gabrielle Destroismaisons portrayed Lucy in a French Canadian musical production Dracula - Entre l'amour et la mort.
In 2011, Anaïs Delva played the role of Lucy Westenra in the French musical Dracula – L'amour plus fort que la mort.

In novels
In December, 2010, Simon and Schuster (Gallery Books) released "The Secret History of Elizabeth Tudor, Vampire Slayer" purportedly as told to Lucy Weston.

In comics
Lucy Westenra has several appearances in the Marvel Comics - mostly in retellings of the Dracula story, as compiled by Bram Stoker - and has (with her name occasionally misspelled) an entry in the Official Handbook of the Marvel Universe.

Radio
In 1938, the CBS radio series The Mercury Theatre on the Air made its debut with Dracula. Lucy appears in the middle of the broadcast as the ill fiancée of Arthur Seward, and it is only later established that she is a victim of Dracula. Elizabeth Farrell performed as Lucy, opposite Orson Welles.

References

Notes

Bibliography

Literary characters introduced in 1897
Dracula characters
Fictional socialites
Fictional vampires
Fictional people from London
Female characters in literature
Female horror film characters